The 2011 CIS Men's Final 8 Basketball Tournament was held March 11–13, 2011. It was the first of two consecutive CIS Championships to be held at the Halifax Metro Centre. The tournament was previously held 24 consecutive years in Halifax before being moved to Ottawa for three years. The defending champions are the University of Saskatchewan Huskies, who return to the tournament, along with six other qualifiers and one wild card.

The Carleton Ravens won their 7th tournament in nine years with an 82–59 victory over the Trinity Western Spartans in the final. It was also Carleton's 7th title over-all. This was the Spartans' first appearance in the Final 8.

The tournament was broadcast on TSN2. For the second year in a row there was controversy over tape delay of the tournaments, with both semi-finals and the championship game being shown after they had been played.

Championship Bracket

Bronze Medal Bracket

Consolation Bracket

Note: All records are against CIS competition only.

Game Reports
UBC 96-77 Acadia
Trinity Western 82-74 Lakehead
Saskatchewan 91-79 Dalhousie
Carleton 73-66 Concordia
Lakehead 75-67 Acadia
Dalhouse 76-65 Concordia
Trinity Western 74-72 UBC
Carleton 95-83 Saskatchewan
Lakehead 84-80 Dalhousie
UBC 111-95 Saskatchewan

References 

2011
2010–11 in Canadian basketball